Whamageddon is a game played during the 24 days before Christmas Eve in which players try to go from December 1 to the end of Christmas Eve as per European celebrations on the 24th December (11:59pm or 23:59 on the 24th of December) without hearing "Last Christmas" by Wham! If the player hears the song between those days, they are out of the game and have to post "#Whamageddon" on social media to indicate that they have lost. The exceptions to this game are that the player can only listen to remixes and cover versions of the song. Whilst not encouraged on the website, but technically still a part of the rules, a player can send another player the song, or play it to them so that the other player loses the game, although Whamageddon is described as a survival game, as opposed to a battle royale game.

History 
One of the earliest versions of Whamageddon appeared on the internet forum GTPlanet in 2010, under the name "GTPlanet vs. Wham! - Last Christmas". The rules are nearly the same, apart from the game having no defined start date and ending at midnight on 31 December, and the presence of the song within the discussion thread itself being prohibited.

In 2016, a Facebook page was created for Whamageddon under its new name and revised dates that the player takes part from. In 2017, the game gained a small amount of publicity on Boing Boing and Lifehacker. In December 2018, British stand-up comedian, Romesh Ranganathan posted a tweet explaining the rules of Whamageddon to his 416,000+ Twitter followers. Because of the tweet, mainstream and local news websites online also picked up on the popularity of the game.

Whamageddon is featured each year on PrimordialRadio and also features on the Dave Berry Breakfast Show on Absolute Radio.

Gameplay 
Rules adapted from the official website of Whamageddon.
 The player must go as long as possible without hearing Wham!'s Christmas song, "Last Christmas"
 The game starts on the 1st of December and ends at "the end of December 24th" (i.e., 23:59 December 24th).
 Only the original version of "Last Christmas" applies, the player can listen to remixes and covers of the song
 The player is out as soon as they recognise the original version of the song
 The player must post "#Whamageddon" on social media as soon as they lose the game
 Players can play on a "player vs player" if they wish, by sending links to the song to friends to try and get them out of the game, although it is not encouraged
 Playing "Last Christmas" outside another competitor's house is considered dastardly and should be avoided.
 An acceptable alternative is to (previously) pair your mobile device with the players Alexa device (inside their home) and then WhamBomb! them from outside.

Once a player has lost they are sent to 'Whamhalla'.

Usual places where players get knocked out tend to be cafes, shopping centres, drive-time radio, and Christmas work parties.  When a player is unexpectedly knocked out, this is known as a 'Whambush'.

Alternative variations 
Other variations of this game exist, based on other Christmas songs. One features "Fairytale of New York" by the Pogues, and originated on Twitter in 2016. The only rules that apply to this version of the game is no "Poguerolling" (sending the link to friends online intentionally). As with Whamageddon, the player is out as soon as they recognise the song and accidentally hear it, whether it is in a supermarket or on the radio, or in another public place.

Since the death of Wham!'s George Michael on Christmas Day in 2016, the GTPlanet forums has transitioned using to Mariah Carey's "All I Want For Christmas is You" as an alternative challenge. This version of the game is termed "ApoCareypse", and all of the original rules apply.  A similar challenge with the exact same song and similar rules, "Mariahpocalypse", surfaced on Facebook in the late 2010s.  Unlike Whamageddon, Mariahpocalypse begins on Black Friday and ends at midnight on December 26th.

In New Zealand, "Snoopy's Christmas" is sometimes used as the featured song.

Another version is WhamHunter where players get a point each time they hear it. This allows enjoyment of Christmas music and not having to worry when walking through a shopping centre or when the radio is playing in the car. The only rule is hearing it must be organic (i.e. don't have it on repeat).

A Polish version is entitled Świąteczny Golf Muzyczny (Christmas Music Golf). The game starts Nov. 1 and players are not allowed to hear remixes and covers.

See also 
Little Drummer Boy Challenge

References

Musical culture
Games of mental skill
In-jokes
Internet memes
Internet memes introduced in 2010